Matt Garbowsky (born July 26, 1990) is a Canadian professional ice hockey center. He is currently an unrestricted free agent who most recently played with the Graz99ers of the Austrian Hockey League (EBEL).

Playing career

Junior
Garbowsky played two seasons for the Powell River Kings of the British Columbia Hockey League (BCHL). He scored 172 points (87 goals, 85 assists) in 146 games during the two seasons, and was named a 2011 Coastal Conference All-Star and MVP.

College
Garbowsky attended Rochester Institute of Technology where he played four seasons (2011–15) with the RIT Tigers men's ice hockey team, which competes in NCAA's Division I in the Atlantic Hockey conference. In his four seasons at RIT, during three of which he served as captain, he compiled 114 points (48 goals, 66 assists), placing him fifth all-time among RIT players during the team's Division I era. He was forced to miss 24 games during his junior season (2013–14) due to a wrist injury, but still managed to record 7 points in just 13 games. In his senior year (2014–15), Garbowsky was selected as Atlantic Hockey's Player of the Year, named to the All-Atlantic Hockey First Team, and was a finalist for the Hobey Baker Award. He tallied 54 points in 40 games and led all Division I players with 729 face-off wins during the season.

Professional
After completing his collegiate career, Garbowsky agreed to a one-year contract with the Rochester Americans of the AHL for the 2015–16 season. He also signed a tryout contract with the Americans to be able to play in the remainder of the 2014–15 season, where he appeared in 8 games and recorded 1 point.

In his first full professional season, on October 6, 2015, Garbowsky was assigned to the Americans ECHL affiliate, the Elmira Jackals, training camp. On October 25, 2015, Garbowsky was recalled to the Amerks after playing in four games with the Jackals. Garbowsky appeared in 16 games over the course of the season in the AHL, however finished with 21 points in 33 games with the Jackals.

As a free agent in the off-season and unable to garner an AHL contract, Garbowsky opted to continue in the ECHL, signing a one-year deal with the Colorado Eagles, a secondary affiliate to the Colorado Avalanche, on August 16, 2016. He was named MVP of the ECHL All-Star Classic on January 18, 2017.

After two standout championship seasons with the Eagles, Garbowsky opted to sign his first contract abroad, agreeing to a one-year deal with the Graz 99ers of the Austrian Hockey League (EBEL) on June 21, 2018.

Career statistics

Awards and honours

References

External links 

Living people
1990 births
Canadian ice hockey centres
Colorado Eagles players
Elmira Jackals (ECHL) players
Graz 99ers players
Powell River Kings players
RIT Tigers men's ice hockey players
Rochester Americans players
Sportspeople from the County of Brant
Canadian expatriate ice hockey players in the United States
AHCA Division I men's ice hockey All-Americans